Amoruso is a surname. Notable people with the surname include:

Nicola Amoruso (born 1974), Italian footballer
Lorenzo Amoruso (born 1971), Italian footballer
Luca Amoruso (born 1975), Italian footballer
Sophia Amoruso (born 1984), American businesswoman

See also
Amorosi (disambiguation)
Amoroso (disambiguation)